Anthony Robin Le Clerc Mosse  (born 29 October 1964 in Hong Kong) is a former New Zealand swimmer who competed at two Summer Olympic Games and three Commonwealth Games.  He won one Olympic bronze medal, as well as two gold medals, one silver and one bronze at the Commonwealth Games.

Biography
Mosse was the standard bearer for New Zealand competitive swimming through the 1980s. He swam at his first Commonwealth Games, in Brisbane, Australia in 1982, when he was 17. At the 1983 Summer Universiade in Edmonton, Mosse won a bronze medal in the 200-metre butterfly. He also finished 5th in the 100-metre butterfly. At the Los Angeles Olympics, he made the final in his two butterfly events.

At the 1985 Summer Universiade in Kobe, Mosse won a silver medal in the 200-metre butterfly. He also finished 5th in the 100-metre butterfly At the 1986 Commonwealth Games in Edinburgh, Scotland, he won gold and silver and in the same year was second in the 200m butterfly final at the World Championships. At the 1987 Summer Universiade in Zagreb, Mosse won a gold medal in the 200-metre butterfly, and a silver medal in the 100-metre butterfly. Mosse developed his career in the United States but continued to swim for New Zealand, gaining a bronze medal at the 1988 Olympics in Seoul, Korea. He rounded out his career when he won the 200m butterfly at the 1990 Commonwealth Games in Auckland.

Mosse gained a BA (Hons) from Stanford University in 1989 and later completed an MBA at the same university. He and his American wife have two children. He is now a merchant banker in San Francisco, but continues to be involved in swimming and is a regular commentator for TVNZ (including Beijing, 2008).

In the 1989 Queen's Birthday Honours, Mosse was appointed a Member of the Order of the British Empire, for services to swimming.

See also
 List of Commonwealth Games medallists in swimming (men)
 List of Olympic medalists in swimming (men)

References

External links
 
 
 
 

1964 births
Living people
Olympic swimmers of New Zealand
Olympic bronze medalists for New Zealand
Swimmers at the 1984 Summer Olympics
Swimmers at the 1988 Summer Olympics
Commonwealth Games gold medallists for New Zealand
Commonwealth Games silver medallists for New Zealand
Swimmers at the 1982 Commonwealth Games
Swimmers at the 1986 Commonwealth Games
Swimmers at the 1990 Commonwealth Games
American people of New Zealand descent
New Zealand male butterfly swimmers
Olympic bronze medalists in swimming
World Aquatics Championships medalists in swimming
Stanford Cardinal men's swimmers
New Zealand Members of the Order of the British Empire
Medalists at the 1988 Summer Olympics
Commonwealth Games bronze medallists for New Zealand
Commonwealth Games medallists in swimming
Universiade medalists in swimming
Universiade gold medalists for New Zealand
Universiade silver medalists for New Zealand
Universiade bronze medalists for New Zealand
Medalists at the 1983 Summer Universiade
Medalists at the 1985 Summer Universiade
Medalists at the 1987 Summer Universiade
Medallists at the 1986 Commonwealth Games
Medallists at the 1990 Commonwealth Games